The 24th parallel south is a circle of latitude that is 24 degrees south of the Earth's equatorial plane, about 60 km south of the Tropic of Capricorn. It crosses the Atlantic Ocean, Africa, the Indian Ocean, Australasia, the Pacific Ocean and South America.

Around the world
Starting at the Prime Meridian and heading eastwards, the parallel 24° south passes through:

{| class="wikitable plainrowheaders"
! scope="col" width="125" | Co-ordinates
! scope="col" | Country, territory or ocean
! scope="col" | Notes
|-
| style="background:#b0e0e6;" | 
! scope="row" style="background:#b0e0e6;" | Atlantic Ocean
| style="background:#b0e0e6;" |
|-
| 
! scope="row" | 
|
|-
| 
! scope="row" | 
|
|-valign="top"
| 
! scope="row" | 
| Limpopo Mpumalanga - for about 13 km
|-
| 
! scope="row" | 
|
|-
| style="background:#b0e0e6;" | 
! scope="row" style="background:#b0e0e6;" | Indian Ocean
| style="background:#b0e0e6;" | Mozambique Channel
|-
| 
! scope="row" | 
|
|-
| style="background:#b0e0e6;" | 
! scope="row" style="background:#b0e0e6;" | Indian Ocean
| style="background:#b0e0e6;" |
|-valign="top"
| 
! scope="row" | 
| Western Australia Northern Territory Queensland
|-
| style="background:#b0e0e6;" | 
! scope="row" style="background:#b0e0e6;" rowspan="2" | Pacific Ocean
| style="background:#b0e0e6;" | Coral Sea
|-
| style="background:#b0e0e6;" | 
| style="background:#b0e0e6;" | Passing just south of Raivavae island,  Passing just south of Oeno Island, 
|-
| 
! scope="row" | 
|
|-
| 
! scope="row" | 
|
|-
| 
! scope="row" | 
|
|-
| 
! scope="row" | 
| Mato Grosso do Sul - for about 4 km
|-
| 
! scope="row" | 
|
|-valign="top"
| 
! scope="row" | 
| Mato Grosso do Sul Paraná São Paulo - passing south of the city of São Paulo
|-
| style="background:#b0e0e6;" | 
! scope="row" style="background:#b0e0e6;" | Atlantic Ocean
| style="background:#b0e0e6;" | Passing just south of São Sebastião Island, 
|}

See also
23rd parallel south
Tropic of Capricorn
25th parallel south

s24